Lunar Crater National Natural Landmark is a volcanic field landmark located  east-northeast of Tonopah in Nye County, in central Nevada. It was designated a National Natural Landmark in 1973.

Volcanic features
A  crater that is thought to have been formed by several volcanic explosions, and is one of two maars in the Lunar Crater volcanic field of the Pancake Range.

Astronaut Training
In Sept. 1972, the crater was used by NASA to geologically train the Apollo Astronauts in recognizing volcanic features expected at the Apollo 17 landing site.  Their field exercises included two rover traverses.  Astronauts who would use this training on the Moon included Apollo 16's John Young and Charlie Duke, besides Apollo 17's Gene Cernan and Jack Schmitt.  Notable geologist instructors included William R. Muehlberger.

See also

National Natural Landmarks in Nevada
Volcanic fields of the Great Basin Section

References

National Park Service - official Lunar Crater National Natural Landmark website
Bureau of Land Management: Lunar Crater Back Country Byway
Lunar Crater National Natural Landmark, Great Basin, Nevada

Volcanic fields of Nevada
Volcanic fields of the Great Basin section
National Natural Landmarks in Nevada
Maars of Nevada
Protected areas of Nye County, Nevada
Protected areas of the Great Basin
Bureau of Land Management areas in Nevada
Landforms of Nye County, Nevada